Korosten Raion is a raion (district) of Zhytomyr Oblast, northern Ukraine. Its administrative centre is Korosten. It makes Korosten raion the largest by area in Ukraine. Population: 

On 18 July 2020, as part of the administrative reform of Ukraine, the number of raions of Zhytomyr Oblast was reduced to four, and the area of Korosten Raion was significantly expanded. The January 2020 estimate of the raion population was

Economy
Agricultural Institute of Polesia is located in the village of Hrozyne.

See also
Davydky
Khodaky
Kupech

References

External links

 Find out Korosten District @ Ukrainian.Travel {en}

 
Raions of Zhytomyr Oblast
1923 establishments in Ukraine